Atherton Mill was a heritage streetcar station in Charlotte, North Carolina. The former at-grade side platform was located in front of the Trolley Barn at Atherton Mill and it had served as the southern terminus of the Charlotte Trolley, which connected South End to Uptown Charlotte.

History

Atherton Mill and its immediate area 
The Atherton Cotton Mill was built in 1892 and was the first industrial mill in the planned Dilworth factory district. It operated from 1893 to 1933, when Atherton Mills, Inc. lost ownership due to foreclosure. In 1937, the J. Schoenith Company, Inc. purchased the mill and converted to manufacturer "high grade" candy, baked goods, and peanut products. Lasting till the early 1960s, the facility since then was utilized as a wholesaling site for textile-related manufacturing companies and then later converted into office and residential condominiums. In 2017, part of the property was partitioned and redeveloped into a mixed-use development called Novel Atherton.

The Parks-Cramer Company Complex was built in 1919 and was expanded several times; the facility manufactured air conditioning equipment for textile mills and operated till 1988, when the firm sold its operations. Soon afterwards, the complex was converted into retail and office spaces.

The Trolley Barn, located between Atherton Mill and the Parks-Cramer Company Complex, was originally a section of warehouse, for Atherton Mill, before being converted into a museum and restoration shop in 1996 for the Charlotte Trolley. The Charlotte Area Transit System (CATS) took over operations in 2003 and by 2007 the facility was repurposed as a Farmers' market once the museum was relocated near Bland Street station. In 2017, the Trolley Barn section was kept while the rest of the original warehouse building was razed. In 2021, the building was repurposed as a restaurant and brewery, called the Trolley Barn Fermentory and Food Hall, with the farmers' market relocated to the adjacent courtyard area.

Charlotte Trolley service 
Located in front of the Trolley Barn, the station began operations on August 30, 1996. Consisting of a fence-separated seating area along one of the two tracks, the station operated Thursday through Sunday and then daily on June 28, 2004. Service was temporarily halted from February 5, 2006 through April 20, 2008; after-which the station operated on a limited schedule. When the Charlotte Trolley ended service on June 28, 2010, the Atherton Mill station, along with three other trolley only stations, ceased operations. In 2019, the second track that ended in front of the Trolley Barn was removed and replaced with a cement walkway that connects to Tremont station and the Charlotte Rail Trail.

References

External links

 Atherton Mill station
 South End Charlotte

Former Charlotte Area Transit System stations
Atherton Mill
Railway stations in the United States opened in 1996
Railway stations closed in 2010